The Battle of Gorangpo was one of a series of coordinated attacks beginning on 25 June 1950 that marked the beginning of the Korean War.

Order of battle

Democratic People's Republic of Korea 
 1st Infantry Division - Brigadier General Choe Kwang
 1st Infantry Regiment - Colonel Hwang Seok
 2nd Infantry Regiment - Colonel Kim Yang-choon
 3rd Infantry Regiment - Senior Colonel Lee Chang-kwon
 Artillery Regiment - Colonel Hyun Hak-bong
 6th Infantry Division - Brigadier General Bang Ho-san
 13th Infantry Regiment - Colonel Kim Hoo-jin
 14th Infantry Regiment - Colonel Han Il-rae
 15th Infantry Regiment - Colonel Kim Hyun-ki
 Artillery Regiment - Senior Colonel Lim Hae-min

Republic of Korea 
 1st Infantry Division - Colonel Paik Sun-yup
 11th Infantry Regiment - Colonel Choe Kyung-rok
 12th Infantry Regiment - Lieutenant Colonel Kim Jeom-gon
 13th Infantry Regiment - Colonel Kim Ik-ryeol
 15th Infantry Regiment - Colonel Choe Young-hee

References

Battles and operations of the Korean War in 1950 
Battles of the Korean War involving South Korea 
Battles of the Korean War involving North Korea
Battles of the Korean War
History of Gyeonggi Province
June 1950 events in Asia